Raut Group of company (RGB) Is situated at Gop, puri, Odisha. It is group who own many companies. RGB owned by Rajesh Kumar Raut

Mission
The Massachusetts Promise Fellowship provides leadership training to young adults who commit to one year of service to the State's Commonwealth.

The 5 Promises
Massachusetts Promise Fellows work to deliver the 5 Promises to youth and their communities. These are well-defined objectives developed in partnership with host sites and funders. All Fellow projects align with at least one of these five promises:

Marketable Skills:
Fellows will work closely with and support emerging youth leaders as the young people develop and implement a variety of activities, programs, and projects that benefit their community.

Caring Adult:
Fellows will develop new mentoring programs and expand upon current mentoring programs in an effort to establish and support new mentor/mentee matches.

Safe Place:
Fellows will develop and lead out-of-school enrichment activities (i.e., adventure programming, service-learning projects, tutoring, athletics) for young people.

Healthy Start:
Fellows will coordinate and lead education and outreach efforts (i.e., newsletters, web sites, seminars, summits, workshops, dances) to inform and educate young people on a variety of issues and topics (i.e., sex education, health care access, nutrition, substance abuse prevention, diversity awareness, conflict resolution, HIV/AIDS, legal rights, mental health).

Opportunity to Serve:
Fellows will actively recruit, train, and manage volunteers that will serve to support their project and the mission of their host organization.

References

External links
 Massachusetts Promise Fellowship website
 America's Promise Alliance website
 Massachusetts Promise Fellowship on Northeasern's Website

Organizations based in Massachusetts